Michael Marten may refer to

 Michael Marten, founder of the Science Photo Library
 Michael Marten, former leader of the Iona Community